Flos chinensis, the Chinese plushblue, is a butterfly in the family Lycaenidae. It was described by Cajetan and Rudolf Felder in 1865. It is found in the Indomalayan realm (Sikkim, Bhutan, Assam, southwest China to Shanghai).

References

External links
"Flos Doherty, 1889" at Markku Savela's Lepidoptera and Some Other Life Forms

Flos
Butterflies described in 1865
Butterflies of Asia
Taxa named by Baron Cajetan von Felder
Taxa named by Rudolf Felder